The Cap Blanc Lighthouse (also known as the Ras Nouadhibou Lighthouse) is an active  lighthouse located on Ras Nouadhibou (French: Cap Blanc) in Mauritania.  Constructed in 1910, it is today located only a few feet from Mauritania's border with Western Sahara.  In recent years the lighthouse has been incorporated as the rear range light of a pair of leading lights. A modern fiberglass light structure forms the front of the range.  The lighthouse serves as a landfall light for the port of Nouadhibou. A few kilometers northeast near Cansado is the Pointe de Cansado lighthouse, built in 1913.

See also

List of lighthouses in Mauritania

References

Lighthouses completed in 1910
Transport buildings and structures in Mauritania
Nouadhibou
Dakhlet Nouadhibou Region
Lighthouses in Africa